Katherine Hunter  may refer to:

Catherine Hunter (poet), Canadian poet
Catherine Hunter (filmmaker) (born 1960), Australian filmmaker
Kathryn Hunter, English actress
Kit Hunter, Katherine "Kit" Hunter, fictional character from Home and Away
Kaki Hunter (born Katherine Susan Hunter), American actress, architect, and writer

See also
Hunter (surname)